Charles Bullock may refer to:
Charles Bullock (rector) (1829-1911), British parish priest and author
Charles J. Bullock (1869-1941), American economist
Charles S. Bullock III (born 1942), American political scientist
Chick Bullock (1898-1981), American jazz bandleader